Balıklı (Laz language: Pilargeti) is a village in the Arhavi District, Artvin Province, Turkey. Its population is 114 (2021).

References

Villages in Arhavi District
Laz settlements in Turkey